Kigali Pelé Stadium, nicknamed Nyamirambo Regional Stadium, is a multi-purpose stadium in the Nyamirambo neighbourhood of Kigali, Rwanda. It is currently used mostly for football matches and hosts several teams in the Rwanda Premier League, including APR FC and Rayon Sports.

It has an artificial turf surface and seats 22,000 spectators. The stadium was deemed unfit to host international matches in 2021 by the Confederation of African Football and underwent a renovation that began in January 2023 ahead of the 73rd FIFA Congress, hosted by Kigali. It reopened on March 15, 2023, and was renamed in honor of late Brazilian footballer Pelé by Rwanda president Paul Kagame and FIFA president Gianni Infantino.

In 1998, the stadium was used for the public executions of 21 individuals convicted of involvement in the Rwandan genocide, including Froduald Karamira.

References

Football venues in Rwanda
Athletics (track and field) venues in Rwanda
Multi-purpose stadiums in Rwanda
Sports venues in Kigali